Kastljós is an Icelandic news magazine and talk show on the Icelandic national television channel RÚV. Þóra Arnórsdóttir is the current editor and former host of the show. The hosts for 2019-2020 are Einar Þorsteinsson and Jóhanna Vigdís Hjaltadóttir. The show is broadcast live four nights a week, Monday through Thursday, at 7:35 p.m.

List of celebrities interviewed on the show
 Cliff Richard (2007)
 Daniel Tammet (2007)
 Roger Moore
 Daft Punk
 Josh Groban (2007)
 Silvía Night
 Sissel Kyrkjebø (2006)
 Yoko Ono
 Björk (2008)

References

External links
An interview of Silvía Night on Kastljós (in Icelandic, with English subtitles in the interview piece) Note: contains swearwords
The interview of Björk Guðmundsdóttir on Kastljós (in Icelandic, without subtitles), 29 october 2008

2005 Icelandic television series debuts
2000s Icelandic television series
2010s Icelandic television series
RÚV original programming